There are two species of agama named Baluch ground agama:

 Trapelus ruderatus
 Trapelus persicus